Haplocosmia himalayana is a tarantula also known as the Himalayan banded earthtiger or the Himalayan purple-banded earth tiger tarantula. It was first described by Reginald Innes Pocock in 1899, and as its common name implies, it is found in the Himalayas. This species has also been suggested as a pest controller,

Description 
Males of this species can live up to 5 years and females up to 15 years. Females may grow up to 13 cm, while males only reach up to 6 cm. Both sexes have a light brown, grayish carapace and opisthosoma, with legs that are mostly dark brown with a tan patella.

Distribution 
The species is found in the southern edge of the Himalayan foothills, around the Dehradun district, a region of temperate climate with cold winters.

Behavior 
The species makes burrows in moist soil and constructs webs for seclusion. It feeds on other invertebrates, including their own species, and is weell adapted to kill large prey.

References 

Spiders described in 1899
Theraphosidae
Spiders of Asia